William Forbes-Sempill, 17th Lord Sempill (20 May 1836 – 21 July 1905), born William Forbes, was a Scottish peer, the 17th Lord Sempill and 8th Baronet of Craigievar.

He was the son of Sir John Forbes, 7th Baronet, and succeeded his father to the baronetcy on his death in February 1846, at the age of seven. He was educated at Eton and then joined the Coldstream Guards in 1854; he served in the Crimean War, rising to the rank of captain. In 1884, he inherited the title of Lord Sempill from his relation Maria Jane Sempill, 16th Lady Sempill, and adopted the surname of Sempill.

He married three times, the first time in 1858 to Caroline, the only daughter of Sir Charles Forbes, 3rd Baronet; this ended in divorce in 1861, after the birth of one daughter, Katherine. Katherine married the naturalist George Muirhead FRSE in 1907.

The second marriage was in 1862 to Frances Emily Abercromby, the youngest daughter of Sir Robert Abercromby, 5th Baronet, in 1862. They had seven children, five sons and two daughters. Their third son, William, died aged one. The remaining sons served in the military. The eldest, John commanded a battalion of the Black Watch at the Battle of Loos. The second son, Douglas, a Major in the Seaforth Highlanders, was killed on the North-West Frontier of India in 1908. The fourth son, Robert, a Lieutenant in the 5th Bn. Gordon Highlanders, was killed by a sniper on 2 June 1915, aged 45, near Festubert whilst working with his men repairing a gap blown in the parapet of their trench. He is buried in Le Touret Military Cemetery. The youngest of the four, Arthur, was in the Royal Navy, and survived the Battle of Jutland. The elder daughter, Evelyn, married Duncan Vernon Pirie MP, whilst the younger, Gertrude, never married.

The third marriage was in 1890, to Mary Sherbrooke.

On his death in 1905, his titles were inherited by his son John.

References

1836 births
1905 deaths
People educated at Eton College
Coldstream Guards officers
British Army personnel of the Crimean War
Lords Sempill
William
William